Extreme Survival is a survival television series hosted by Ray Mears. The series was produced for the BBC.  In the series Mears demonstrates his wilderness skills and presents tales of survival from some of the world's most difficult environments. The show was first broadcast in 1999, after the success of World of Survival from 1997 to 1998, and ended in 2002.

Episodes

Series One
 Costa Rica
 Arctic Survival
 Psychology of Survival
 Sea Survival
 Geronimo
 Arnhemland

Series Two
 Morocco
 Rocky Mountains
 Australian Desert
 Royal Air Force
 Alps
 Desert Island

Series Three
 Belarus
 Rogers' Rangers
 Alaska
 Namibia
 Thailand
 New Zealand

DVD release
The first and second series DVD, containing two discs was released on 24 March 2003. The third series was released on DVD separately on 19 May 2003. Both sets were released by Mears' own studio, Woodlore.

See also
World of Survival
Ray Mears' Bushcraft
Wild Food
Ray Mears Goes Walkabout

References

External links
 RayMears.com
 

BBC television documentaries
Works about survival skills
1999 British television series debuts
2002 British television series endings